The men's 4 × 100 metre medley relay competition of the swimming events at the 1959 Pan American Games took place on 2 September. The defending Pan American Games champion is the United States.

Results
All times are in minutes and seconds.

Heats
The first round was held on September 2.

Final 
The final was held on September 2.

References

Swimming at the 1959 Pan American Games